Prečani may refer to:

 Prečani Serbs, an ethnonym
 Prečani (village), a village in Bosnia
 Prečani, a native plural form for the inhabitants of Preko